Commins is a small settlement of about half a dozen dwellings in Denbighshire, Wales.

Villages in Denbighshire